Daniel Ng Neh-Tsu (born September 30, 1974) is an actor, director and producer based in Hong Kong. He is known as a "flexible and distinctive" leading actor in the Chinese language film industry. Since his film debut in 1998, he has been featured in over 60 films. He also starred in the AMC martial arts drama series Into the Badlands.

Early life
Daniel N Wu was born in Berkeley, California, and raised in Orinda, California. His parents, Diana (née Liu), a college professor, and George Wu, a retired engineer, are natives of Shanghai, China. His father immigrated to the United States from China and met his mother in New York, where she was a student. After marrying, they settled in California. Wu has two older sisters, Greta and Gloria, and an older brother who died when he was two.

Wu developed an interest in martial arts when he saw Jet Li in The Shaolin Temple and Donnie Yen in Iron Monkey, and consequently began studying wushu at age 11. His childhood role model was Jackie Chan, a man who now considers Wu "like a son". Wu attended the Head-Royce School in Oakland, California and later majored in architecture at the University of Oregon. While there, he founded the University of Oregon Wushu Club in 1994 and served as the team's first coach. During this time, Wu took film classes and frequented local theaters, and came to enjoy the works of filmmakers like Akira Kurosawa and Luc Besson, whom he describes as "men of vision."

Following graduation, Wu traveled in 1997 to Hong Kong to witness the handover of Hong Kong, with no intention of taking on a film career. At the suggestion by his sister, Wu began modeling. Four months later, film director Yonfan, after seeing Wu featured in a clothing ad, approached Wu about starring in an upcoming film.

Career
Despite his inability at the time to speak Cantonese or read Chinese, Wu successfully completed his first film, Yonfan's Bishonen in 1998. As of this day, when Wu receives a Cantonese script, his assistant reads the entire piece, while he makes notes on the pronunciation. The day after Bishonen wrapped, Wu was offered the leading role in Mabel Cheung's City of Glass (for which Wu was nominated as best new actor at the 18th Hong Kong Film Awards) and later, a supporting part in Young and Dangerous: The Prequel, from Andrew Lau's gangster film series. Around this time, Wu met Jackie Chan at a restaurant opening and was quickly signed to Chan's JC Group with agent Willie Chan.

Wu's breakthrough performance came in 1999 with his role in Benny Chan's Gen-X Cops. He followed this success with roles in a variety of films including big-budget thriller Purple Storm, arthouse production Peony Pavilion and the successful Love Undercover. In 2001, Wu received criticism from the Hong Kong media for sexual scenes with Suki Kwan in Cop on a Mission, but Wu says that same criticism attracted the attention of directors and the film represented a turning point in the types of roles he chose in the future.

Wu's first experience in film production came with his starring role in Julian Lee's 2003 film Night Corridor. Due to budgetary constraints, Wu participated in the search for funding for and distribution of, the film and recruited Jun Kung to create the soundtrack. Though Night Corridor dealt with "risky" themes, Wu felt he had less reliance on image than many of his pop-star actor peers, and he was nominated for best actor at Taiwan's 40th Golden Horse Film Awards for his effort. During 2003, Wu took part as producer and creative director on MTV's Whatever Things!, a Jackass-styled program aired in Asia, also featuring Sam Lee, Josie Ho, Terence Yin, and other celebrities. During 2003, Wu took part in a stage production of The Happy Prince at the Edward Lam Dance Theater as part of the Hong Kong Arts Festival, during which he recited a 16-minute monologue in Cantonese, learned entirely from pinyin. In 2005, Wu was nominated as best actor at the 24th Hong Kong Film Awards for his role in Derek Yee's One Nite in Mongkok, and as best supporting actor for New Police Story. At the 41st Golden Horse Film Awards, Wu won the award for best supporting actor for New Police Story. The win came as a surprise to him, because he "didn't think that much" of his performance in the film.

In 2005, Chinese media began to report that Wu had formed a boy band, Alive, with Terence Yin, Andrew Lin and Conroy Chan. Wu and his bandmates posted information, updates, personal thoughts (including slamming Hong Kong Disneyland, for which they were spokespersons), and the band's music, at their official website. In 2006, Wu made his writing and directorial debut with The Heavenly Kings, which chronicles Alive's formation and exploits. After the film's release, however, it was revealed that The Heavenly Kings was actually a mockumentary of the Hong Kong pop music industry, and Alive was constructed purely as a vehicle to make the film; the film's characters represented only 10–15% of their real-life counterparts and much of the footage blurred the line between fiction and reality. Wu admitted his own singing voice "sucked really bad", and the band had their voices digitally enhanced for its music, to prove that "it's easy to fake it". Despite some backlash from the media over being intentionally fed false information in the film about illegal downloads of the band's music, Wu won the best new director award at the 26th Hong Kong Film Awards, an achievement he called "a group effort."

In 2011, Wu starred alongside Kevin Spacey in director Dayyan Eng's bilingual film Inseparable. It premiered at the Busan International Film Festival and was released in cinemas in China and other territories worldwide, making it Wu's first English-language film performance.

From 2015 to 2019, he starred as Sunny on the AMC action series Into the Badlands, for which he also served as executive producer.

In 2016, he portrayed via motion capture and voiced Gul'dan, the central antagonist of the action fantasy film Warcraft, based upon the Warcraft video game series  by Blizzard Entertainment. In 2018, he appeared in Tomb Raider, based upon the video game series of the same name, as Lara Croft's sidekick, Captain Lu Ren. In 2021, he appeared in Reminiscence, director Lisa Joy's feature film debut.

Other ventures
In April 2007, Wu re-launched his band's old website, AliveNotDead.com, with Terence Yin and RottenTomatoes.com founders Patrick Lee and Stephen Wang, as a place for filmmakers, musicians, and other artists to collaborate, receive exposure, network, and interact with fans. He continues his modeling career as spokesperson for a variety of products such as Seiko and L'Oréal. Wu posed for the charity photography album SuperStars by Leslie Kee, and performed on rapper Jin's song "HK Superstar." Wu is an investor in Racks MDB Shanghai, which opened in 2008.

Personal life
Wu maintains residences in Hong Kong, Shanghai, Beijing, and Oakland, California. He continues to actively train in wushu as well as other martial arts.

On April 6, 2010, Wu married Lisa S. in South Africa. Their daughter, Raven, was born in May 2013.

In 2018, Daniel Wu denied rumors of supporting Hong Kong independence and has explicitly stated his opposition for it.

On February 5, 2021, Wu partnered with Daniel Dae Kim to offer a $25,000 reward for information leading to the arrest of the perpetrators of a series of attacks against elderly Asian Americans in the Bay Area. Yahya Muslim, a suspect who was already in police custody for a separate assault, was later arrested for the crimes.

Both Wu and Lisa are godparents to Ase Wang's daughter.

Filmography

Film

Television

Awards and nominations

References

External links

Daniel Wu's Official Blog
Daniel Wu's Interview with Hong Kong Cinema 2005

1974 births
Living people
20th-century American male actors
20th-century Hong Kong male actors
21st-century American male actors
21st-century Hong Kong male actors
American expatriates in Hong Kong
American film directors of Hong Kong descent
American film producers
American male actors of Hong Kong descent
American male film actors
American male models
American male screenwriters
Film directors from California
Film producers from California
Hong Kong film directors
Hong Kong film producers
Hong Kong male film actors
Hong Kong male models
Hong Kong screenwriters
Male actors from Berkeley, California
Male models from California
People from Orinda, California
Screenwriters from California
University of Oregon alumni
American born Hong Kong artists